Don't Let the Kids Win is the debut studio album by Australian singer/songwriter Julia Jacklin. It was released in October 2016 under Polyvinyl Record Co., Transgressive Records and Liberation Records.

At the J Awards of 2016, the album was nominated for Australian Album of the Year. At the ARIA Music Awards of 2017, the album was nominated for ARIA Award for Best Female Artist and ARIA Award for Best Cover Art.

Critical reception 
At Metacritic, which assigns a normalised rating out of 100 to reviews from mainstream publications, the album received an average score of 81, based on 12 reviews. El Hunt of DIY praised the album, noting that "'Don't Let the Kids Win' shines brightest for its clear, and charismatic narrative voice." Lauren Down of Under the Radar gave the album a positive review, saying "It's in examining her own life through different colored lenses that this album becomes something remarkable."
The Guardian'''s Michael Hann wrote "Don’t Let the Kids Win'' feels very much like one of those albums that will slowly creep into the affections of a large number of people; it’s that lovely."

Track listing

Charts

Personnel 

 Julia Jacklin - vocals, guitar
 Eddie Boyd - guitar
 Tom Stephens - drums, bass
 Mitchell Lloyd Scott - bass
 Joe McCallum - drums
 Ben Edwards - production, mixing
 Nick McKinlay - photography

References 

2016 albums
Julia Jacklin albums
Polyvinyl Record Co. albums
Transgressive Records albums